Jagat may refer to:
Jagat, Budaun, a Block and Nagar panchayat in Budaun district
a village in Rajasthan, India, best known for its Ambika Mata temple 
a village in Lamjung District in the Gandaki Zone of northern-central Nepal
Jagat (film), a 2015 Malaysian crime film.